Broadwater is a rural locality in the Southern Downs Region, Queensland, Australia.

History 
Broadwater Provisional School opened in 1902 and became Broadwater State School on 1 January 1909. It closed in 1922. In parallel, Broadwater Crossing Provisional School opened on 10 July 1905 and became Broadwaster Crossing State School on 1 January 1909. After the closure of Broadwater State School in 1922, in 1926 Broadwater Crossing State School was renamed Broadwater State School.

Road infrastructure
The Stanthorpe – Texas Road runs through from east to west.

Amenities 
The Broadwater branch of the Queensland Country Women's Association has its hall at 626 Texas Road.

Education 
Broadwater State School is a government co-educational primary school (P-6) at 638 Texas Road. In 2016, the school had an enrollment of 46 students with 3 teachers (2 full-time equivalents) and 5 non-teaching staff (3 full-time equivalents).

References 

Southern Downs Region
Localities in Queensland